The rugby sevens competition at the 2018 Central American and Caribbean Games was held in Barranquilla, Colombia from 1 to 2 August at the Estadio Moderno.

Men's competition

Group stage

Pool A

Pool B

Knockout stage

Medal summary

Medal table

References

External links
2018 Central American and Caribbean Games – Rugby sevens

2018 Central American and Caribbean Games events
Central American and Caribbean Games
2018